Attorney for the Heart  is a 1927 German silent romance film directed by Wilhelm Thiele and starring Lil Dagover, Jean Murat, and Ernst Stahl-Nachbaur. The film's sets were designed by the art director Alexander Ferenczy.

Cast

References

Bibliography

External links

1927 films
1920s romance films
German romance films
Films of the Weimar Republic
German silent feature films
Films directed by Wilhelm Thiele
Phoebus Film films
German black-and-white films
Films with screenplays by Wilhelm Thiele
1920s German films